The 1998 Queensland Cup season was the 3rd season of Queensland's top-level statewide rugby league competition.

The competition was contested by sixteen teams over a 27-week long season (including finals), with the Norths Devils defeating the Wests Panthers 35–16 in the Grand Final at Suncorp Stadium. Logan  Shane Perry was named the competition's Player of the Year.

Teams 
The competition returned to a 16-team format in 1998 with the Bundaberg Grizzlies returning to the competition after a year's absence and the admission of the Townsville Stingers and Gold Coast Vikings. The Port Moresby Vipers withdrew after two seasons in the competition after they were unable to continue to pay their travel and accommodation costs. Also in 1998, the Pine Rivers Brothers played as the Brisbane Brothers, while the Logan City Scorpions became the Logan Scorpions.

In 1998, a number of NRL clubs partnered with Queensland Cup sides, sending players not selected in first grade to play in the competition. The Brisbane Broncos were affiliated with Brisbane Brothers, the Gold Coast Chargers with the Gold Coast Vikings, the Melbourne Storm with the Norths Devils, the North Queensland Cowboys with the Townsville Stingers and the Adelaide Rams with the Wests Panthers.

Results 
In 1998, the Queensland Cup became a full 22-round competition, unlike the previous two seasons which had 17 and 18 regular season rounds.

Ladder

Finals series

Grand Final 

Norths, who finished the season as minor premiers, qualified for their first Grand Final after defeating Brothers and Redcliffe in the finals series. Wests, who finished third, had a tougher road to their first Grand Final appearance, losing in Week 1 to Redcliffe. From there, the Panthers won three straight elimination games to qualify for the decider. When the two sides met in the regular season, Norths defeated the Panthers 42–22 in Round 5 at Purtell Park.

First half 
Wests halfback Jason Twist scored the first points of the game after four minutes with a try close the posts. 15 minutes later, Wests added four more points when winger Mark Maguire crossed in the corner. The Panthers added to their tally soon after when Twist crossed for his second, backing up Shaun Valentine who made a break down the field. Trailing 16-0, Norths finally got on the board when centre Matt Geyer scored the first of his three tries.

Second half 
The second half was all Norths, as they ran in 29 unanswered points to secure their maiden premiership. Devils' prop Anthony Bonus crashed over right next to the posts to cut the lead to four, before Geyer scored his second to level the scores. John Wilshire's sideline conversion put Norths in front by two, their first lead of the game coming in the 60th minute. Captain Kevin Carmichael was the next to score for Norths, with second-rower Andrew Hamilton kicking a field goal 10 minutes later to extend Norths' lead to seven. Norths finished with two late tries to Craig O'Dwyer and Geyer to cap a remarkable 19-point win. The 16-0 deficit they overcame is (as of 2019), the biggest comeback in a Queensland Cup Grand Final.

Geyer and Matt Rua would go onto play in the Melbourne Storm's NRL Grand Final win over the St George Illawarra Dragons a year later, while Steven Bell would win an NRL premiership with the Manly Sea Eagles in 2008.

Player statistics

Leading try scorers

Leading point scorers

End-of-season awards 
 Courier Mail Medal: Shane Perry ( Logan Scorpions)
 Rookie of the Year: Jamie Tomlinson ( Redcliffe Dolphins)

See also 

 Brisbane Rugby League
 Queensland Cup
 Queensland Rugby League
 Winfield State League

References 

1998 in Australian rugby league
Queensland Cup